Endoclita sinensis is a species of moth of the family Hepialidae. It is known from China, Korea and Taiwan, as well as from the Far East of Russia. Food plants for this species include Castanea and Quercus.

References

External links
Hepialidae genera

Moths described in 1877
Hepialidae
Moths of Japan
Moths of Asia
Moths of Korea
Moths of Taiwan